Poseidon Rex is a 2013 horror film directed by Mark L. Lester. While searching for long-lost Mayan treasure using explosives, underwater explorers accidentally awaken a prehistoric predator that can travel on the land and in the sea. The film was released September 22, 2013.

Plot
On a small island off the coast of Belize, Jackson Slate is forced by the local crime kingpin, Tariq to dive for lost Mayan gold in the Great Blue Hole. Jackson and two other divers detonate explosives at the bottom of the hole to find the gold, although the ensuing explosion knocks Jackson unconscious, and releases a prehistoric, tyrannosaurus rex-type creature into the water, which kills the two other divers, as well as Tariq's guard on the surface. Meanwhile, couple Rod and Jane are on vacation on the island, and are taken to the hole by boater Henry to go snorkeling. However, they come across Jackson floating in the water and Henry takes him, as well as Rod and Jane, to his marine biologist friend, Sarah's house to nurse him back to health. But they find a gold coin that Jackson kept for later and question him about it. Jackson reveals his trouble with Tariq, although invites the group to diving with him to find the rest of the gold. All go except Jane; who decides not to get caught up in the potential trouble Jackson is in and she stays on the island.

Two of Tariq's men are sent to search for Jackson's team, although they are killed by the same reptilian creature. Jackson's group, as well as the local coast guard find the wreckage, as well as a severed arm, which Sarah concludes was bitten off by a giant creature. However, despite this, Jackson and Sarah go diving for the gold while Rod, and Henry remain at the surface and find a series of eggs belonging to the creature, deciding to take one to Sarah's lab to study. Meanwhile, Jane is invited by two tourists to join her on a boat party. But the boat is attacked by the creature; Jane is knocked off the boat and drowns while everybody else is killed by the creature. Rod and Henry rush to save her, but they are too late and she dies, devastating Rod. At the lab, the egg hatches, birthing a smaller, similar reptilian creature, which attacks Jackson and Sarah, causing them to lock it in a refrigerator. Tariq and his men soon arrive to confront Jackson, although he releases the baby creature on them that (seemingly) killing them as Jackson and Sarah escape, and reunite with Rod, and Henry.

Now aware there is a deadly creature in the water, the group heads out onto the sea with the coast guard to try to kill the creature. However, their attempts fail and Henry is killed. The remaining group returns to shore and the coast guard heads out to destroy the creature once more, although it quickly kills them before attacking and killing people on land. Jackson, Sarah and Rod attempt to steal a car, although Tariq arrives still demanding Jackson for the gold. The creature eats Tariq; allowing Jackson, Sarah, and Rod to escape. After picking up guns at Tariq's compound, they are chased into the forest by the creature before escaping to an abandoned military base, where they decide to spend the night. They attempt to radio for help, although to no avail. Jackson, and Sarah have sex that night before the group gets a response from the military the next morning, which states they're going to bomb the island in order to kill the creature and they have to escape.

Jackson decides to fly a plane over the ocean to distract the creature while Sarah and Rod escape in a boat. However, the creature chases the boat instead and Rod attempts to shoot it with a bazooka, although he falls into the water and is eaten. As several fighter jets bomb the creature and wound it, Sarah takes the bazooka and fires it, decapitating the creature. Sarah returns to land and reunites with Jackson, although they realize that they forgot to destroy the dozens of eggs still in the ocean, one of which hatches in the meantime.

Cast

References

External links

2013 films
2013 horror films
2010s monster movies
Films about dinosaurs
American natural horror films
Giant monster films
Syfy original films
2010s English-language films
Films directed by Mark L. Lester
2010s American films